Maastricht Noord is a railway station in the north of Maastricht, the Netherlands. The station features 360 car parking spaces and park and ride facilities with connections to the centre of Maastricht.

Train services
Maastricht Noord station is served by Arriva with the following train services:
Local stoptrein S4: Maastricht–Heerlen

References

External links
NS website

Noord
Railway stations opened in 2013
Railway stations on the Heuvellandlijn